The Engeløy Bridges are two bridges in the municipality of Steigen in Nordland county, Norway.  The bridges were built in 1978 to connect the island of Engeløya to the mainland.  

The higher bridge goes from the mainland at the village of Bogen to the small island of Ålstadøya.

The other (lower) bridge curves around from the small island of Ålstadøya to the large island of Engeløya.

See also
List of bridges in Norway
List of bridges in Norway by length
List of bridges
List of bridges by length

References

Steigen
Road bridges in Nordland
Bridges completed in 1978
1978 establishments in Norway
Roads within the Arctic Circle